Say Lo Yar Say is a 1971 Burmese black-and-white drama film, directed by Shumawa U Kyaw starring Zaw One, Swe Zin Htaik, Lin Htin and Yway Yway.

Cast
Zaw One
Swe Zin Htaik
Lin Htin
Yway Yway

References

1971 films
1970s Burmese-language films
Films shot in Myanmar
Burmese black-and-white films
1971 drama films
Burmese drama films